Angelfish Software is an on-premises, self-hosted web analytics application that allows organizations to monitor how users interact with websites and web-based applications. Angelfish can use web server logs or JavaScript page tags to create reports. 

First released in 2013, Angelfish Software was created in response to Google's cancellation of Urchin and a perceived lack of on-premises web analytics software options.

Angelfish provides solutions for tracking Intranet and SharePoint environments, and its customers include organizations that are required to protect website visitor data due to regulations or cannot use Google Analytics due to data privacy concerns.

See also
 Web analytics
 Information Privacy
 List of web analytics software

References

External links
 
https://www.analyticsmarket.com/blog/website-analytics-software-review, Web Analytics Software Review.

Business software
Web analytics